Isabela Petrov Iantosca (born 9 June 1973) is a former professional tennis player from Mexico.

Biography
Petrov, who was born in Mexico City, won a bronze medal for Mexico in the women's doubles tournament at the 1991 Pan American Games in Havana.

From 1991 to 1993, she featured in nine Fed Cup ties for her native country. Receiving a full scholarship to attend Pepperdine University, Petrov played NCAA Division I tennis for the Waves, earning All-American honors in 1996 and 1997.

Since 2000 she has worked in marketing for ESPN International in New York.

ITF finals

Singles: 3 (1–2)

Doubles: 7 (3–4)

References

External links
 
 
 

1973 births
Living people
Mexican female tennis players
Pepperdine Waves women's tennis players
Tennis players from Mexico City
Tennis players at the 1991 Pan American Games
Pan American Games bronze medalists for Mexico
Pan American Games medalists in tennis
Central American and Caribbean Games medalists in tennis
Central American and Caribbean Games gold medalists for Mexico
Medalists at the 1991 Pan American Games
20th-century Mexican women
21st-century Mexican women